Ladislav Hrušovský (born 4 January 1973) is a Slovak actor.

Filmography 
 2007 - Demoni (film)
 2007 - Mesto tieňov I (TV series)
 2008 - Kriminálka Anděl (TV series)
 2008 - Mesto tieňov II (TV series)
 2009 - "Ako som prežil" (TV series)
 2009 - Panelák (TV series)
 2010 - 2011 - Aféry (TV series)
 2013 - Agata Schindler's Diary (film)
 2016 - Učiteľka (The Teacher) (film)

References 

Slovak actors
Living people
1973 births